Chalamont is a commune in the Ain department in eastern France.

Geography

The Veyle has its source in the western part of the commune, in the Magnenet pond.

Population

See also
Dombes
Communes of the Ain department

References

External links

Chalamont official website
La Dombes and Chalamont

Communes of Ain
Dombes
Ain communes articles needing translation from French Wikipedia